Dhanushka Ranasinghe (born 31 October 1992) is a Sri Lankan cricketer. He made his Twenty20 debut on 6 January 2020, for Unichela Sports Club in the 2019–20 SLC Twenty20 Tournament. He made his first-class debut on 6 March 2020, for Moors Sports Club in the 2019–20 Premier League Tournament.

References

External links
 

1992 births
Living people
Sri Lankan cricketers
Moors Sports Club cricketers
Place of birth missing (living people)